Nicholas Adam Hardwick (born September 2, 1981) is an American former professional football player who was a center in the National Football League (NFL), playing his entire 11-year career for the San Diego Chargers. He was selected by the Chargers in the third round of the 2004 NFL Draft, and was named to the Pro Bowl in 2006. He played college football for Purdue.

High school career
Hardwick attended at Lawrence North High School in Indianapolis, Indiana. Unlike most of his peers, he did not play high school football, having "ditched" the sport in the ninth grade. He was a three-year varsity letterman in wrestling and won a state championship.

College career
Hardwick was a sophomore economics major at Purdue University when his future San Diego Chargers teammate Drew Brees led the Boilermakers to the 2001 Rose Bowl. Inspired, he joined the football team as a walk-on, initially playing as a defensive tackle. The next year, he became the team’s starting center and earned all-Big Ten honors. During his senior year, his starting quarterback was Kyle Orton, who was drafted the following year.

Professional career

2004 NFL Draft
Hardwick was picked with the 66th overall selection in the 3rd round of the 2004 NFL Draft by the Chargers.

San Diego Chargers
In 2004, Hardwick began his career by starting all 14 games he played in when incumbent starter Jason Ball held out due to a contract dispute. During the year, the Chargers ranked sixth in rushing offense and allowed the fourth-fewest sacks in the league.

In his second year as a pro, he again started all games he played in as the Chargers ranked in the top ten in rushing offense and in the top half of the league in sacks allowed.

During the 2006 off-season, he agreed to a five-year $17 million contract extension with the Chargers.
He then went on to start all 16 games for the first time in his career as the Chargers ranked second in rushing offense and eighth in sacks allowed.

In December 2006, Hardwick was named the backup center for the AFC squad in the 2007 Pro Bowl, Jeff Saturday being the starter. He was one of 11 Chargers selected to the Pro Bowl that year.

In his fourth season with San Diego, he started 12 games, being forced to miss 4 due to a foot injury.

In 2008, Hardwick was inactive for the first three weeks of the season while recovering from an offseason foot injury.  He returned to the starting lineup at center in Week 4 to play the remaining 13 games.

In 2009, Hardwick suffered an ankle injury so severe that it nearly ended his career. He missed 13 games that season, but returned in time for a late-season push to the playoffs and he hasn’t missed a game since.

2010 was a comeback year for the center as he was back to his usual form. He started all 16 games for the second time of his career.

In 2011, Hardwick played another full season starting every game. He was one of the few players on a crippled offensive line hurt by multiple injuries. After the 2011 season ended, Hardwick became an unrestricted free agent, he had recently become a new father, and he had just watched one of his best friends and linemates, left guard Kris Dielman retire after suffering a serious concussion. All three factors led Hardwick to ponder whether he wanted to continue playing football, and if he did, whether he wanted to play it in San Diego or make a fresh start elsewhere. Hardwick decided to stay in San Diego and finish his career there, opting to sign a new three-year contract with the Chargers, worth $13,500,000.

In his 10th year with the Chargers, Hardwick maintained his place at center, starting in all 16 games and earning Chargers' Lineman of the Year honors for the second time in a row. However, quarterback Philip Rivers was sacked 49 times, a career high, due to the offensive line's struggle with injury and poor performance.

On September 10, 2014 the Chargers placed Hardwick on injured reserve with a neck injury, ending his season after one game. He announced his retirement on February 2, 2015.

Serious health concerns played a large part in Hardwick's decision to retire. "Nerves were getting compressed through various forms. My hands were going numb during training camp for weeks at a time. I was losing feeling in my fingers up through my elbows. I was having a bunch of stingers. On a daily basis, my hands were asleep, my elbows were burning, and I was losing a normalcy to life. It became reckless to continue playing".

Personal life

Hardwick is married to his college sweetheart Jayme-Lee Biamonte, who played for the Boilermakers women's soccer team and currently serves as the San Diego State Aztecs women's soccer assistant coach. They have two sons.

References

External links

 San Diego Chargers bio
 Purdue Boilermakers profile

1981 births
Living people
American Conference Pro Bowl players
American football centers
Los Angeles Chargers announcers
National Football League announcers
People from Franklin, Indiana
Players of American football from Indianapolis
Players of American football from San Diego
Purdue Boilermakers football players
San Diego Chargers announcers
San Diego Chargers players
Ed Block Courage Award recipients